The 2010–11 Australian Figure Skating Championships was held in Melbourne from 25 November through 3 December 2010. Skaters competed in the disciplines of men's singles, ladies' singles, ice dancing, and synchronized skating across many levels, including senior, junior, novice, adult, and the pre-novice disciplines of primary and intermediate.

Senior results

Men

Ladies

Ice dancing

Synchronized

References

2010 in figure skating
2011 in figure skating
Figure Skating Championships 2010-11
Figure Skating Championships 2010-11
2010